Axel Louis Augis (born 6 December 1990) is a French male artistic gymnast and a member of the national team. He participated at the 2015 World Artistic Gymnastics Championships in Glasgow, and qualified for the 2016 Summer Olympics.

References

External links 
 
 
 

1990 births
Living people
French male artistic gymnasts
People from Courbevoie
Gymnasts at the 2016 Summer Olympics
Olympic gymnasts of France
Universiade medalists in gymnastics
Sportspeople from Hauts-de-Seine
Mediterranean Games bronze medalists for France
Mediterranean Games medalists in gymnastics
Competitors at the 2018 Mediterranean Games
Universiade gold medalists for France
European Games competitors for France
Gymnasts at the 2015 European Games
Medalists at the 2017 Summer Universiade
21st-century French people